PRAN-RFL Group is a Bangladeshi conglomerate, founded in 1981 by Amjad Khan Chowdhury. The company is known for its diversified business portfolio, including food and beverage, plastic products, and agricultural machinery. It is one of the largest conglomerates in Bangladesh, with a presence in more than 145 countries. Pran-RFL Group is headquartered in Dhaka, Bangladesh, and employs over 10,000 people worldwide. The group operates under several subsidiaries, including Pran Foods, RFL Plastics, Pran-RFL Healthcare, and many others.

Pran Foods is the flagship company of the group, and it is known for its popular juice and snack products. RFL Plastics is one of the largest plastic manufacturers in South Asia, producing a wide range of household goods and industrial plastic products. Apart from its core businesses, the group also operates in real estate, media, and hospitality sectors. Pran-RFL Group has several joint ventures with international companies, such as PepsiCo, Danone, and Nestlé.

In recent years, the group has focused on expanding its business in the Middle East and Africa Region. The company has also been actively involved in corporate social responsibility initiatives, including education, health, and environment. The Pran-RFL Group has won numerous awards and recognition for its contributions to the economy of Bangladesh. It is also considered one of the top employers in the country, with a commitment to employee welfare and development.

History 
PRAN (Programme for Rural Advancement Nationally) was established in 1981 by retired Major General Amjad Khan Chowdhury and has become one of the largest food and beverage brands in Bangladesh. PRAN pioneered agribusiness in Bangladesh by providing farmers with guaranteed prices. PRAN Foods, a subsidiary of the PRAN-RFL Group, produces a number of agricultural products under the PRAN banner. PRAN established a subsidiary company in UAE in 2003.

In 2008, the company announced plans to open a production facility in Tripura, India, after the Indian government lifted the ban on direct investment from Bangladesh in 2007. The PRAN group's exports had reached 10 billion taka by 2016, with the biggest markets for the company in India, Saudi Arabia, the UAE, Malaysia, and Oman. The same year the revenue for PRAN exceeded US$500 million. PRAN started exporting potatoes in March 2016.

In April 2016, PRAN started to export cassava and the first shipment, worth US$3 million, was sent to New Zealand. PRAN has 80 thousand direct employees and 200 thousand indirect employees. PRAN exports to over 118 countries.

PRAN started exporting through river route to India from Bangladesh in March 2021.

Businesses 
PRAN-RFL Group contains two Groups, called PRAN-Group & RFL-Group.

Businesses operating under these groups contains several registered companies/businesses. Below are some of them-

Awards 
 Top VAT payers Awards from the National Board of Revenue for being top VAT payer in different financial year.
 National Productivity Award by National Productivity Organization.
 Best Employer Brand Award.
 National Export Trophies.

Factories 
 Habiganj Industrial Park, Sayestaganj, Habiganj, Sylhet
 PRAN Industrial Park, Palash, Narshingdi
 RFL Industrial Park, Mulgaon, Kaliganj, Gazipur
 Danga Industrial Park, Kazirchar, Danga, Palash, Narshingdi
 Rupganj RFL Factory, Rupganj, Dhaka
 Rangpur Foundry Ltd., BSCIC, Kallabong, Rangpur
Pran Agro Ltd, Natore

References 

Food product brands
Bangladeshi brands
Conglomerate companies of Bangladesh
Food and drink companies of Bangladesh
Manufacturing companies of Bangladesh
Bangladeshi companies established in 1981